Aumes is a commune in the Hérault department in southern France. Guillaume d’Abbes de Cabrebolles (1718–1802), Encyclopédiste, died in Aumes.

Population

Images

See also
Communes of the Hérault department

References

Communes of Hérault